The nuvistor is a type of vacuum tube announced by RCA in 1959.  Nuvistors were made to compete with the then-new bipolar junction transistors, and were much smaller than conventional tubes of the day, almost approaching the compactness of early discrete transistor casings. Due to their small size, there was no space to include a vacuum fitting to evacuate the tube; instead, nuvistors were assembled and processed in a vacuum chamber with simple robotic devices. The tube is made entirely of metal with a ceramic base. Triodes and a few tetrodes were made; Nuvistor tetrodes were taller than their triode counterparts. 

Nuvistors are among the highest performing small signal receiving tubes. They feature excellent VHF and UHF performance plus low noise figures, and were widely used throughout the 1960s in television sets (beginning with RCA's "New Vista" line of color sets in 1961 with the CTC-11 chassis), radio and high-fidelity equipment primarily in RF sections, and oscilloscopes. RCA discontinued their use in television tuners for its product line in late 1971.

Other nuvistor applications included the Ampex MR-70, a studio tape recorder whose entire electronics section was based on nuvistors, as well as studio-grade microphones from that era, such as the AKG/Norelco C12a, which employed the 7586. It was also later found that, with minor circuit modification, the nuvistor made a sufficient replacement for the obsolete Telefunken VF14 tube, used in the Neumann U 47 studio microphone. Tektronix also used nuvistors in several of its high end oscilloscopes of the 1960s, before replacing them later with JFET transistors. Nuvistors were used in the Ranger program and in the MiG-25 fighter jet, presumably to harden the fighter's avionics against radiation. (See radiation hardening.) This was discovered following the Defection of Viktor Belenko.

Types
 7586 - First one released, medium mu triode
 7587 - Sharp cutoff tetrode (Anode is top located)
 8056 - triode for low plate voltages
 8058 - triode, with plate cap & grid on shell, for UHF performance
 7895 - 7586 with higher mu
 2CW4 - Same as type 6CW4, but with a 2.1 volt / 450 milliampere heater.  Used in television receivers with series heater strings
 6CW4 - high mu triode, most common one in consumer electronics
 6DS4 - remote cutoff 6CW4
 6DV4 - medium mu, intended as UHF oscillator, shell sometimes gold plated
 8393 - medium mu triode, equivalent of 7586 except heater is 13.5 volts at 60 mA, used in Tektronix equipment.
 13CW4 - same as 6CW4, but with 12.6 Volt / 230 milliampere heater

Dissection of a Nuvistor triode tube

References

External links

 The Nuvistor

RCA brands
Vacuum tubes